John Barry may refer to:

Arts and entertainment
 John Arthur Barry (1850–1911), Australian journalist
 John Barry (composer) (1933–2011), English film composer
 John Barry (set designer) (1935–1979), British film production designer
 John M. Barry (born 1947), American writer
 John Barry, drummer and member of Stretch Arm Strong

Military
 John Barry (naval officer) (1745–1803), officer in the Continental Navy during the American Revolutionary War and in the United States Navy
 SS John Barry, an American Liberty ship
 John D. Barry (1839–1867), brigadier general in the Confederate States Army during the American Civil War
 John Barry (VC) (1873–1901), recipient of the Victoria Cross

Politics
 John S. Barry (1802–1870), governor of Michigan
 John Barry (MP) (1845–1921), Irish MP for South Wexford 1885–1893
 John Patrick Barry (1893–1946), Canadian politician and lawyer
 John Barry (Green Party politician) (born 1966), Irish Green Party politician

Sports
 Jack Barry (baseball) (1887–1961), given name John, American baseball shortstop and coach
 John Burke Barry (1880–1937), member of the U.S. equestrian team at the 1924 Summer Olympics
 John Barry (tennis) (born 1928), New Zealand tennis player
 John Joe Barry (1925–1994), Irish Olympic athlete
 Jon Barry (born 1969), American basketball player

Other
 Sir John Barry, rector of St Andrew's Church, Chew Stoke, 1524–1546
 John Milner Barry (1768–1822), Irish doctor
 John Alexander Barry (1790–1872), Canadian merchant and politician in Nova Scotia
 John Barry (bishop) (1799–1859), Irish-born American bishop in the Roman Catholic Church
 John Barry (Dean of Elphin) (1728–1794), Irish Anglican dean
 John Vincent Barry (1903–1969), Supreme Court justice for Victoria, Australia
 John Barry (WD-40) (1924–2009), American business executive; popularized the WD-40 water-displacing spray and lubricant
 John Barry (ship), one of several vessels named John Barry
 John Barry, used by Australians as a placeholder name, similar to John Q. Public

See also
 John Wolfe Barry (1836–1918), English architect
 Jonathan Barry (born 1988), Bahamian cricketer
 Jonathan B. Barry (born 1945),  American politician and public servant
 John Barrymore (1882–1942), American actor
 John Barrie (disambiguation)
 Jack Barry (disambiguation)
 John Berry (disambiguation)

Barry, John